Charleston is a ghost town in Harper County, Oklahoma, United States.  The post office was established June 18, 1901.  It was named after Charles I. Eilerts, who was the first postmaster and a merchant in the area. The town was laid out on Eilerts' homestead about 1908.

At its height, the town had two churches, a school, two general stores, a blacksmith shop and a livery stable, with a population of about 100.  However, the town was bypassed by the railroad, and population declined in the 1920s. The post office was moved to Selman, but retained the name Charleston until 1923. The school continued until 1933.  Some of the town's  buildings were moved to Buffalo and Selman; others remain.

References

Geography of Harper County, Oklahoma
Ghost towns in Oklahoma